Two ships of the United States Navy have been named Aulick, in honor of John H. Aulick.

 , was a Clemson-class destroyer, commissioned in 1919, and transferred to the Royal Navy where she served as HMS Burnham during World War II.
 , was a Fletcher-class destroyer, commissioned in 1942, and decommissioned in 1946. She was later sold to Greece in 1977.

Sources
 

United States Navy ship names